The American Bankruptcy Institute Law Review is a biannual law journal published by St. John's University School of Law and the American Bankruptcy Institute (ABI). A free digital edition of the Law Review is distributed to all American Bankruptcy Institute members as part of their membership. A print edition (two issues per year) is available for an additional charge.

History
The journal is a student-run law review that was established in 1992 by a group of St. John's University School of Law students. It contains articles and student notes on issues of bankruptcy law.

Conrad B. Duberstein National Bankruptcy Moot Court Competition 
The journal cosponsors the Conrad B. Duberstein National Bankruptcy Moot Court Competition with the St. John's Moot Court Honor Society.

Bankruptcy Case Blog
Each journal staff member contributes to the Bankruptcy Case Blog, which contains brief updates on recent bankruptcy decisions and the implications of those decisions for bankruptcy law.

Student organization 
Membership on the American Bankruptcy Institute Law Review is offered to students who have attained a minimum grade point average of 3.3 and successfully complete the St. John's University School of Law writing competition held at the end of first-year day and second-year evening programs.

External links

United States bankruptcy law
American law journals
St. John's University (New York City)